The second season of Sunt celebru, scoate-mă de aici! premiered on September 4, 2022, on Pro TV. Cabral Ibacka returned to host the series alongside Adela Popescu who took over hosting duties from Mihai Bobonete, who hosted the series for its first season. Filming for this season began in July 2022 in La Romana, Dominican Republic.

Celebrities

The line-up was announced on August 8, 2022, and consisted of 12 celebrities divided into two teams: orange team and purple team.

Camps
On Day 1, the camp was split in two for the first time in Sunt celebru, scoate-mă de aici! the good camp (orange team) and the bad camp (purple team). Orange team consisted of Alex, Anisia, Bia, Cornel, Paul and Ruxi. Purple team consisted of Cristi, Giani, Lidia, Mara, Răzvan and Tania. These teams were chosen by the team leaders, Anisia Gafton (orange) and Mara Bănică (purple), with Gafton choosing first as she won in a competition between them.

The two teams competed in Bushtucker Trials for food, and in Celebrity Chests for treats and other luxury items.

Nominations

Results and elimination

Team captains/camp leader

Ratings
Official ratings are taken from ARMA (Asociaţia Română pentru Măsurarea Audienţelor), the organisation that compiles audience measurement and television ratings in Romania.

References

I'm a Celebrity...Get Me Out of Here!
2022 Romanian television seasons